Lineth Isabel Cedeño Valderrama (born 5 December 2000) is a Panamanian professional footballer who plays as a forward for Italian Serie A club UC Sampdoria and the Panama women's national team. She is nicknamed Palito (Little stick).

International goals
Scores and results list Panama's goal tally first

See also
 List of Panama women's international footballers

References

External links
Lineth Cedeño at BDFutbol

2000 births
Living people
Sportspeople from Panama City
Panamanian women's footballers
Women's association football forwards
Tauro F.C. players
Hellas Verona Women players
U.C. Sampdoria (women) players
Serie A (women's football) players
Panama women's international footballers
Footballers at the 2019 Pan American Games
Pan American Games competitors for Panama
Panamanian expatriate women's footballers
Panamanian expatriate sportspeople in Spain
Expatriate women's footballers in Spain
Panamanian expatriate sportspeople in Italy
Expatriate women's footballers in Italy